List of churches in Vilnius, Lithuania, includes existing places of worship – churches, synagogues, kenesas – even if they are no longer used for religious purposes.

List

References

 
Vilnius
Churches in Vilnius